Guatemala competed at the 1976 Summer Olympics in Montreal, Quebec, Canada.

References
Official Olympic Reports

Nations at the 1976 Summer Olympics
1976
Olympics